Dallas Bay Skypark  was a public-use airport located 11 miles (18 km) north of the central business district of Chattanooga and 4 miles southwest of the central business district of Lakesite (both cities in Hamilton County, Tennessee, United States). It is located in the community of Middle Valley with a Hixson, Tennessee mailing address.

History

Dallas Bay Skypark began as the Optimist Club Drag Strip back in the late 50s, and survived until the early 60s. The dragstrip was moved to East Ridge. John Flewellen and his family bought the old dragstrip and turned it into a private runway. In the early 1970s the airstrip became an FAA-certified public airport with the designation 1A0.

In 2002, a group of investors with a passion for flying, bought Dallas Bay Skypark and ran it until its closure in 2021. The airport was a full-service public airport with a flight school on premises.

In April 2021, the airport owners notified tenants that the airport would close before the end of the year.

Facilities and aircraft 

For the 12-month period ending May 4, 1998, the airport had 10,108 aircraft operations, 100% of which were general aviation.

References

External links 
Dallas Bay Skypark (official site)
Dallas Bay Skypark page at Tennessee DOT Airport Directory

Defunct airports in Tennessee
Airports in Tennessee
Buildings and structures in Hamilton County, Tennessee
Transportation in Hamilton County, Tennessee